Montgomery is a village in Kane and Kendall counties, Illinois. The population was 20,262 at the 2020 census. Between 2000 and 2010 the village population grew 237 percent, making Montgomery the ninth fastest growing municipality in Illinois during the decade.

Geography
Montgomery is located in southern Kane County and northern Kendall County at  (41.7188316, -88.3920915). It is bordered to the north and east by Aurora, to the south by Oswego and Boulder Hill, and to the southwest by Yorkville. The village sits on both sides of the Fox River. U.S. Route 30 passes through the village, leading southeast  to Plainfield and northwest  to Sugar Grove. Illinois Route 31 runs through the village on the west side of the Fox River, leading northeast  to the center of Aurora and southwest  to the center of Oswego. Illinois Route 25 runs along the east side of the Fox River, also leading to Aurora and Oswego.
 

Education
Montgomery is served by five different school districts:  West Aurora, East Aurora, Oswego, Yorkville, and Kaneland.

History
The first European settler arriving in the area was Jacob Carpenter, who came to the Chicago area from Logan County, Ohio, in November 1832. In the fall of 1835, Daniel S. Gray, from Montgomery County, New York, visited the area where his brother Nicholas Gray had located in the previous spring, on a farm now within the limits of Kendall County. He made immediate preparations to settle there, and in the fall of 1836, after his family moved from New York state, he built the first wooden house in the area. It was located in the southern part of what is now Montgomery, near the west bank of the Fox River.

Daniel Gray is considered the founder of Montgomery, and bought land grants from the federal government, and had ownership of large tracts of land.

The settlement was called "Graystown" for several years, but eventually Gray convinced other settlers to call the small village "Montgomery" after the New York county where he and several other settlers had origins.

Daniel Gray founded many companies in Montgomery, including a tavern, store, warehouse, foundry, combine and fabrication shop, and one of the best stone grain mills in the county (Gray–Watkins Mill). Gray was making preparations for more business operations, including the establishment of a stationary engine factory, when he died in October 1855. Upon his death, he still owned the majority of the lots in the village. His heirs continued to sell these lots and the village continued to grow.

On February 17, 1858, the village of Montgomery was incorporated. Ralph Gray, son of Daniel Gray, was elected as the first village president. The population of Montgomery remained fairly consistent at about 300 people during the rest of the 1800s.

For much of the twentieth century, the village grew slowly and steadily. Lyon Metal was founded in Montgomery in 1904, and participated in the war effort of World War II. The Aurora Caterpillar manufacturing plant located along the southern border of Montgomery has been producing wheel-loaders since 1959. Western Electric had its Montgomery Works plant along River Street, which became Lucent Technologies and was closed in 1995. In 1962, this factory employed 1,500 people and made telephone parts.

In the beginning of the twenty-first century, Montgomery experienced rapid growth, along with many other communities in Kendall and Kane counties. The 2010 Census documented a population of 18,438 for Montgomery, representing a 237% increase over the previous ten years and making Montgomery one of the fastest-growing communities in Illinois.

In 2003, the Montgomery Economic Development Corporation was founded as a not-for-profit to bring more businesses and jobs to Montgomery. Currently, Caterpillar Machines and Rush-Copley Medical Center are two organizations who have received incentives in exchange for bringing jobs to Montgomery.

Demographics

2020 census

Note: the US Census treats Hispanic/Latino as an ethnic category. This table excludes Latinos from the racial categories and assigns them to a separate category. Hispanics/Latinos can be of any race.

2010 Census
As of the 2010 Census, there were 18,438 people living in the village.  The population density was 1,938.8 people per square mile. The racial makeup of the village was 75.32% White, 8.35% African American, 0.37% Native American, 3.19% Asian, 0.03% Pacific Islander, 9.37% from other races, and 3.37% from two or more races. Hispanic or Latino of any race were 26.7% of the population.

There were 5,998 households, out of which 22.5% had children under the age of 18 living with them, 62.8% were married couples living together, 10.4% had a female householder with no husband present and 22.5% were non-families.  Of all households, 50.8% contained individuals under the age of 18, while 5.8% had someone living alone who was 65 years of age or older.  The average household size was 3.07 and the average family size was 3.52.

In the village, the population was spread out, with 33.25% under the age of 18, 60.16% from 18 to 64, and 6.58% who were 65 years of age or older.

Of the 6,326 dwelling units in the village, 5,998 (94.8%) were occupied.  Of the occupied housing units, 85.1% were owner occupied, with 14.9% occupied by renters.

Arts and culture
The annual Montgomery Fest is held the second weekend in August each year. The fest typically includes a parade, activities for families, and a large fireworks display.

Notable people
 Philip Keck, New York lawyer, judge, and politician; lived in Montgomery, on a farm, with an uncle
 Carole Mathews, actress; appeared on the NBC-TV western series The Californians (1958–1959); Miss Chicago (1938)
 Sean Rash, professional ten-pin bowler originally from Alaska, now residing in Montgomery

Cultural references 
Montgomery was featured as the hometown of Vice President Caroline Reynolds in the fictional TV series Prison Break.  The town actually used in filming was Woodstock, Illinois.

Gallery

See also
 Montgomery Dam

References

External links

1858 establishments in Illinois
Populated places established in 1858
Villages in Kane County, Illinois
Villages in Kendall County, Illinois
Villages in Illinois
Majority-minority cities and towns in Kane County, Illinois
Majority-minority cities and towns in Kendall County, Illinois